The Penn Quakers men's soccer team is an intercollegiate varsity sports team of the University of Pennsylvania. The team is a member of the Ivy League of the National Collegiate Athletic Association.

Roster

Notable alumni 

  Mike Constantino
  Santiago Formoso
  James Gentle
  Seth Roland

See also 
 Penn Quakers

References

External links
 
 All Time Results (1910–2013)

 
1910 establishments in Pennsylvania
Soccer clubs in Philadelphia
Association football clubs established in 1910